Akana is the surname of the following people
Akaiko Akana (1884–1933), Hawaiian pastor
Anna Akana (born 1989), American filmmaker, producer, actress, comedian, and model
Bernard Akana (died 1990), American engineer and politician
Ron Akana (born 1928), American flight attendant
Marques Akana (1964–present), Hawaiian